Fernando Cayo (born 22 April 1968) is a Spanish actor.

Biography 
Cayo was born on 22 April 1968 in Valladolid. He moved to Madrid whe he was 20 years old and began his acting career.

Selected filmography

Awards and nominations

References

External links 

1968 births
Living people
Spanish male film actors
21st-century Spanish male actors
Spanish male television actors
Male actors from Castile and León